Aldrichiomyza is a genus of freeloader flies in the family Milichiidae.

Species
Aldrichiomyza agromyzina (Hendel, 1911)
Aldrichiomyza elephas (Hendel, 1913)
Aldrichiomyza flaviventris Iwasa, 1997
Aldrichiomyza iwasai Papp, 2006
Aldrichiomyza koreana Papp, 2001
Aldrichiomyza longirostris Hendel, 1931

References

Carnoidea genera
Milichiidae
Taxa named by Friedrich Georg Hendel